Rosenbauer is a German language occupational surname for a rose grower. Notable people with the name include:
 Stefan Rosenbauer (1896–1967), German fencer and photographer
 Tom Rosenbauer, fly fishing mentor and author

References 

German-language surnames
Occupational surnames